Ziaullah Khan (born 12 December 1936) is a former Pakistani cricketer who played first-class cricket from 1955 to 1969.

Ziaullah was a left-handed batsman and slow left-arm orthodox spinner. His best season with the ball was 1962–63, when he took 30 wickets at an average of 15.23, and took five wickets in an innings four times. His best figures came in that season, when in a semi-final of the Quaid-e-Azam Trophy he took 5 for 14 and 4 for 53, as well as making 56 (the top score of the match) and 25, for Karachi B against Rawalpindi.

References

External links

1936 births
Living people
Pakistani cricketers
Lahore cricketers
Karachi cricketers
Cricketers from Amritsar